John Paul Miller was a United States Navy officer who very briefly served as acting Naval Governor of Guam, serving as the 28th governor from December 8, 1922, to December 14, 1922.

References

Governors of Guam
United States Navy officers
Year of birth missing
Year of death missing